Oliver Vincent Finney (born 15 December 1997) is an English professional footballer who plays as a midfielder for League Two side Hartlepool United. He joined Hartlepool in January 2023 after seven seasons at his first club, Crewe Alexandra.

Career

Crewe Alexandra
Finney signed professional terms with Crewe in early 2016 while still a scholar in the club's academy. In December 2016, he joined Nantwich Town on loan.

He made his Crewe debut on 6 May 2017, coming on as a 72nd-minute substitute for James Jones against Barnet at Gresty Road, Crewe's final game of the 2016–17 season. On 9 May 2017, Crewe announced that Finney had been offered a new contract by the club, and he signed a new one-year deal on 11 May 2017.

On 1 September 2017, Finney signed for Northern Premier League team Halesowen Town on a two-month loan deal along with teammate Daniel Udoh, returning to Crewe in November after incurring an injury.

Finney signed a further one-year contract with Crewe in May 2018. He made his first start for Crewe in a Football League Trophy tie against Manchester City under-21s on 25 September 2018, and his first start in a league game at Northampton Town on 3 November 2018.

Offered a new contract by Crewe at the end of the 2018–19 season, Finney agreed a new one-year deal with another year option. On 9 October 2019, Finney scored his first Crewe goal, the equaliser in an EFL Trophy tie at Mansfield Town that finished 1–1; he then scored in the penalty shoot-out that Crewe won 4–3. He scored his first two league goals in a 5–0 win over Morecambe at Gresty Road on 23 November 2019.

A contract extension clause was triggered by Crewe in June 2020, and Finney signed a new three-year contract in September 2020. After scoring eight goals in 30 previous appearances during the 2020–21 season, Finney suffered a broken leg due to what Crewe manager David Artell described as "a horrific tackle" by Shrewsbury's Harry Chapman in Crewe's 1–0 win on 2 February 2021. In April 2021, he was rated unlikely to play again in the remainder of the season. In July 2021, Finney agreed another year-long extension to his contract, committing himself to Crewe until 2024.

Hartlepool United
On 31 January 2023, Finney signed for League Two side Hartlepool United on a permanent deal, making his debut in Pools' 1-0 win at Doncaster Rovers on 4 February 2023.

Personal life
Finney is the older brother of Crewe Alexandra F.C. midfielder Charlie Finney.

Career statistics

Honours
Crewe Alexandra
League Two runner-up: 2019–20

References

1997 births
Living people
English footballers
English Football League players
Northern Premier League players
Footballers from Stoke-on-Trent
Crewe Alexandra F.C. players
Nantwich Town F.C. players
Halesowen Town F.C. players
Hartlepool United F.C. players
Association football midfielders